Touch the Earth is an album by a free jazz trio consisting of American trumpeter Wadada Leo Smith, German bassist Peter Kowald and German drummer Günter Sommer, which was recorded live in 1979 and released on the German FMP label. It was reissued on CD in a compilation titled Touch the Earth—Break the Shells, with some tracks from If You Want the Kernels You Have to Break the Shells, another album by the same trio.

Reception
In his review for AllMusic, Thom Jurek states about the Touch the Earth - Break the Shells reissue "This is music of the mind, certainly, but it is also from the body and the earth itself. This is free jazz that sings!."

The JazzTimes review by John Murph says about the reissue "Both wild and peaceful, Touch The Earth-Break the Shells, is an invigorating post-Art Ensemble of Chicago experience."

Track listing
 "Gebr. Loesch" (Sommer) – 4:15
 "Touch the Earth" (Kowald) – 12:50
 "Wind Song in a Dance of Unity" (Smith) – 4:09
 "In Light" (Smith) – 12:08
 "Ein Stück Über Dem Boden" (Kowald) – 3:51
 "Radepur im Februar" (Sommer) – 7:34

Personnel
Peter Kowald – double bass
Wadada Leo Smith – trumpet, flugelhorn, african thumb piano
Günter Sommer – drums, percussion, organ pipes

References

1980 live albums
Wadada Leo Smith live albums
Peter Kowald albums
Günter Sommer albums
FMP Records live albums